The Strong Europe Tank Challenge (SETC) was an annual, multinational tank platoon competition held from 2016 to 2018 at Grafenwöhr Training Area, Germany, and hosted by the U.S. Army Europe and the German Army.

Description
Crews from NATO and non-NATO partners compete in defensive/offensive mounted and dismounted operations. Platoons rotate throughout 12 events with 1,500 possible points in total. The first challenge was held in 2016, with Germany taking first place. The 2017 challenge saw Austria placing first, with Germany and the U.S. taking second and third, respectively. The competition has not been held since 2018.

Results

2016 
The 2016 competition was the first SETC competition. Denmark, Germany, Italy, Poland, Slovenia sent one platoon; the United States sent two. The Czech Republic planned to send a platoon, but the unit failed to arrive. No official place list for team behind the third place was published.

2017 
The second annual competition included three newcomers, Austria, Ukraine and France. Italy, Denmark and Slovenia did not appear.

2018 
The third annual competition took place from June 3rd to the 8th and included two newcomers: Sweden and the United Kingdom.

See also 
 Military exercise
 Canadian Army Trophy
 Worthington Trophy
 Tank biathlon

References

External links
 Strong Europe Tank Challenge
 Strong Europe Tank Competition 2017 • Video Of All 6 Nations

Tanks
Military sports
Military excellence competitions